A payphone (alternative spelling: pay phone) is typically a coin-operated public telephone, often located in a telephone booth or in high-traffic outdoor areas, with prepayment by inserting money (usually coins) or by billing a credit or debit card, or a telephone card. Prepaid calling cards also facilitate establishing a call by first calling the provided toll-free telephone number, entering the card account number and PIN, then the desired telephone number. An equipment usage fee may be charged as additional units, minutes or tariff fee to the collect/third-party, debit, credit, telephone or prepaid calling card when used at payphones. By agreement with the landlord, either the phone company pays rent for the location and keeps the revenue, or the landlord pays rent for the phone and shares the revenue.

Before the ubiquity of mobile phones, payphones were often found in public places to contribute to the notion of universal access to basic communication services. In the late 1920s, the cost of a payphone call in the United States was two cents. In the 1930s, calls were five cents. Early in the 21st century as payphones became rare, the price of a call was fifty cents. One thesis, written as early as 2003, recognized this as a digital divide problem.

In the 20th century, payphones in some countries, such as Spain, used token coins, available for sale at a local retailer, to activate payphones, instead of legal tender coins. In some cases, these were upgraded to use magnetic cards or credit card readers over the years.

Payphones were once ubiquitous worldwide, but their prevalence has declined significantly in the 21st century due to the increasing availability of mobile phones. New York City, which once had 30,000, removed its last public payphone in 2022.

Countries

Australia 
In 2021, Telstra made its public pay phones free (for national calls), for three main reasons:
 in emergencies such as when bush fires damaged mobile phone towers, etc.
 declining revenue started to make collection of coins costly by comparison.
 as a service for people without mobile phones.

Canada

Most payphones in Canada are owned and operated by large telecom providers such as Bell, Telus, and SaskTel. In the last 20 years, customer-owned coin-operated telephones (COCOT) have also appeared in the market, but their numbers are smaller due to the emergence of mobile phones.

The cost of most local payphone calls is 50 cents CAD, having increased from 25 cents since 2007. Payphones in Alberta were 35 cents for a time, but in most jurisdictions the price simply doubled. Newer phones allow users to use calling cards and credit cards. For coin-paid long distance, COCOTs are less expensive for short calls (typically $1 for three minutes) than incumbent providers (whose rates start near $5 for the first minute).

Dialing 0 for the operator and 911 calls are still free.

The Toronto Transit Commission deploys payphones on all subway platforms as a safety precaution; a blue "Crisis Link" button on 141 payphones connects directly with Distress Centres of Canada as a free suicide prevention measure.

As of 2013, there were about 70,000 payphones across the country.

In 2013, the CRTC issued a temporary moratorium on the removal of payphones in small communities.

In September 2015, the CRTC remarked that "32 percent of Canadians used a payphone at least once in the past year," and that they are used "as a last resort in times of inconvenience and emergency."

Germany
The payphone model 23, introduced at Deutsche Bundespost Telekom in 1992, is an electronic software-controlled payphone for analog connections. It is equipped with coin,, and integrated test program setting. It has a remote maintenance – the independent reports of a background system by means of an integrated modem error (for example, defects in components, lack of listeners), operating states (for example, full coin box), or departures (for example standing open the cartridge mounting door, missing coin).

The Payphone 23 consists of two basic units, the equipment part including all the necessary for the operation modules (BG) and the secured below the growing payphone cassettes with the coin box.

Italy
In Italy, public payphones have been installed and maintained over the years by Telecom Italia (formerly SIP).

Most public telephones were decommissioned in the early 2010s. Only a few that met certain requirements remained in operation.

Japan

The majority of payphones on the street and in buildings in Japan are installed and maintained by Nippon Telegraph and Telephone (NTT).

Russia
In the Soviet period, different types of payphones were produced. There were also long-distance call payphones costing 15 kopeks, and also provided services of paid media such as listening to an anecdote, obtaining legal advice, or finding the address of the subscriber by phone number. After the collapse of the Soviet Union and the monetary reform of 1991, this form of payment became irrelevant. Some payphones were altered to accept tokens, while others have been designed to use telephone cards. For example, in St Petersburg, payment for payphones can be made with metro tokens. In some regions, calls from public phones are free of charge.

Spain
Telephones were a monopoly of the national government in Spain. Payphones took a slug or ficha, a piece of metal with two troughs in it, making it hard to counterfeit. Payphones were typically found in bars, restaurants, and stores, never freestanding. Phones would accept some 5 fichas at a time (the exact number varied depending on phone model), showing through a plastic window the number remaining, and return unused ones to the customer.

An older and simpler system was to use a mechanical counter, which automatically counted units of time, called pasos, a "pass" in the sense of "passage of time". The counter was the marcador de pasos. The length of each paso varied depending on the cost (distance) of the call. At the conclusion of a call the number of pasos was multiplied by a fixed amount, which could vary by time of day, creating a sum total that the customer would pay to a human attendant. This system survived in small hotels at least until the 1970s.

Spain also had an institution with no equivalent in the United States, the locutorio, literally "place where one talks". They were a type of store, in the main square of a town or close to it, where one booked a phone call by going to a counter, filling out a paper slip, and handing it to a person (almost always a female). Sometimes advance payment was required (unused minutes refunded). The recipient of the slip would either directly or indirectly, depending on the equipment, make the call and send the customer to a phone booth with a dialless instrument on which to speak. In communities too small to support a locutorio this service might be offered by businesses with telephones, such as pharmacies. Locutorios disappeared in the last quarter of the 20th century, as the whole country moved to direct distance dialing and cell phones (in Spanish "mobile phones") grew.

United Kingdom

In the UK, payphones have been deregulated. The great majority of them are still operated by British Telecom (BT) but other providers exist, mostly in urban areas. Hull, Manchester, London, Cardiff and Glasgow, at the turn of the 21st century, have a greater concentration of non-BT payphones, since BT has been removing payphones which are unprofitable in terms of having few or no calls made in a financial year.

Kiosk adoption
BT allows local communities to adopt the iconic Red K6 Kiosks due to strong opposition to their removal from the communities that the kiosks reside in. This will mean the removal of the phone, leaving the empty kiosk in-situ.

Sponsored kiosk
Another option BT has provided is the sponsored kiosk, that will retain the phone service, and retain the kiosk for an annual fee of around £300 excluding VAT, whether it is the Red K6 or the newer aluminium and glass kiosks that cannot be adopted.

Payphone types

Due to disability discrimination law, specifically the Disability Discrimination Act 1995, in the past payphone providers were required to provide a certain number of textphone payphones as part of their network, as this was deemed a "reasonable adjustment" for deaf customers. These phones can also make voice calls, as well as send SMS and e-mail messages, and although this requirement is no longer in force due to minimal use of the textphone feature in these phones, many of these devices remain in service, generally in populated areas.

In addition, in the early 2000s BT installed a large number of 'Multiphones' that provided internet access, on top of voice, SMS, and e-mail functionality. These payphones provided these services through the use of a 2-channel ISDN2 connection, a QNX-based operating system, and a touchscreen interface to allow the user to browse websites and receive e-mail messages on a pay-per-minute basis. However, these devices have since been removed due to quickly becoming obsolete, often with the ordinary payphone previously installed in that location taking its place once again.

Cost

From 1 June 2010, BT payphones have a £0.60 minimum charge which is for the first 30 minutes of any direct-dialled national geographic call. Previously the minimum charge was £0.40 for the first 20 minutes of any direct-dialled national geographic call. Then before November 2006 the minimum charge was £0.30, before 2004 it was £0.20 and before 2000 it was £0.10. Credit/debit cards can also be used, and many BT payphones have card readers for this service; however, calls made using a card are charged at a significantly higher rate than calls made using cash.

BT Phonecards were introduced in 1981 and could be used in most BT payphones to pay for calls. Purchased from participating retailers, and originally using an optical system to register credit, the design was changed to a chip-based system in the 1990s, before being withdrawn altogether in 2003.

In the past, a BT Chargecard could be used from any UK landline to charge any telephone calls made to the cardholder's BT home telephone account, at no cost to the owner of the landline the card was being used from. These were most commonly used in payphones, and some BT payphones have dedicated readers for these cards. However, this service has since been discontinued. Other cards which are often used instead include supermarket international calling cards and many other telephone cards which can be bought from newsagents.

Although 0800 and 0808 numbers are free to the caller when dialled from most payphones, the owner of the number will be billed a 'Payphone Access Charge' (PAC) which has increased significantly in recent years, and is currently £0.79 per minute, if their number is called from a payphone. This has resulted in many businesses, and even calling card providers, barring calls to their freephone numbers originating from payphones. Charity helplines are exempt from this charge if called from a BT payphone, however this exemption does not apply to calls made from payphones owned by other providers, and in these cases the charity will still have to pay the PAC.

Cost examples (from BT payphones using cash)

There is a £0.40 connection charge, in addition to the "per minute" charges shown below, and a minimum charge of £0.60. Some payphones also offer SMS and e-mail service, both of which are charged at £0.20 per message, and must be paid for using cash.

United States

Payphones were preceded by pay stations, staffed by telephone company attendants who would collect rapid payment for calls placed. The Connecticut Telephone Co. reportedly had a payphone in their New Haven office beginning 1 June 1880; the fee was handed to an attendant. In 1889, a public telephone with a coin-pay mechanism was installed at the Hartford Bank in Hartford, Connecticut, by the Southern New England Telephone Co. It was a "post-pay" machine; coins were inserted at the end of a conversation. The coin mechanism was invented by William Gray; he was issued a series of patents for his devices, beginning with  issued 23 June 1891 for a "Signal Device for Telephone Pay-Stations" which rang a bell for each coin inserted. He subsequently founded the Telephone Pay Station Co. in 1891. The "pre-pay" phone debuted in Chicago in 1898.

By 1902, there were 81,000 payphones in the United States. By 1905, the first outdoor payphones with booths were installed. By the end of 1925, 25,000 of these booths existed in New York City alone. In 1960, the Bell System installed its one millionth telephone booth. Booths, which were expensive, gradually faded away not much later.

The Bell System payphone took nickels (5¢), dimes (10¢), and quarters (25¢); a strip of metal along the top had holes the size of each coin. This made possible a mechanism causing each coin to make a different series of sounds as it fell into the cash box; thus an operator listening could tell how much had been inserted. 

On average, payphone calls generally cost 5¢ into the 1950s and 10¢ until the mid-1980s. Rates standardized at 25¢ during the mid-1980s to early 1990s. The Bell System was required to apply for increases through state public service commissions. Therefore, the actual increases took effect at different times in different locations.

After the breakup of the Bell System in 1984, it was not long before independent stores selling telephones opened up. After that, privately owned payphones hit the market. Sources differ as to whether the peak number of payphones in the United States was 2.6 million in 1995 or 2.2 million in 2000. Since 2007, the number of payphones in the United States in operation has declined by 48%. In July 2009, AT&T officially stopped supporting the Public Payphone service. Over 139,000 locations were sold in 2009. At the end of 2012, the Federal Communications Commission (FCC) reported the number of payphones at 243,487 generating $362 million – falling to $286 million by 2015. The major carriers, AT&T and Verizon, have both exited the business, leaving the market to be served by independent payphone companies. In 2018, it was estimated 100,000 payphones remained in the U.S., with roughly a fifth of them located in New York. Four years later, NYC removed its last public one, though some private pay phones still exist on public property, along with four full-length booths still standing in the Upper West Side (as of May 2022).

In recent years, deregulation in the United States has allowed payphone service provided by a variety of companies. Such telephones are called "customer-owned coin-operated telephones" (COCOT), and are mostly kept in as good condition as compared with a payphone owned and operated by the local telephone company. COCOT contracts are usually more generous to the landlord than telecom ones, hence telecom payphones on private premises have been more often replaced than street phones. One common implementation is operated by vending machine companies and contains a hard-wired list of non-toll telephone exchanges to which it will complete calls.

In the United States, a payphone operator collects an FCC-mandated fee of 49.4¢ from the owner of a toll-free number for each call successfully placed to that number from the payphone. This results in many toll-free numbers rejecting calls from payphones in an attempt to avoid this surcharge; calling cards, which require the caller to dial through a toll-free number, will often pass this surcharge back to the caller, either as a separate itemized charge, a 50¢ to 90¢ increase in the price of the call, or (in the case of many prepaid calling cards) the deduction of an extra number of minutes from the balance of the prepaid card.

"Dead-heads" may have influenced the development of the payphone. Dead-heads were non-subscriber users that made a call at a place of business and did not pay for the call. The Wisconsin Telephone Company in 1893, for example, attempted to put an end to this practice by implementing ten-cent coin slots so that users had to pay for the call. The idea behind this was to reduce the financial stress a smaller business may face from having dead-heads.

In popular culture
In the Superman comic books and live-action films, Clark Kent routinely uses a phone booth to change into his Superman costume.  Similarly, Underdog also changes into his costume from a shoe-shine vendor using a phone booth; this results, however, in the total destruction of the booth and phone set.

The 1978 Superman film pays a humorous homage to this trope by having Superman pause by one of the smaller telephone kiosks more common at that time and glance at it, before running off to change his outfit off-screen.

The opening sequence of the television show Get Smart features a telephone booth as the last in a series of obstacles guarding the Control entrance. Maxwell Smart steps into the payphone, closes the door, dials a number, and the telephone booth floor descends out of sight. This use of a payphone booth is particularly ironic since no member of the public would be able to access it in any case, and Smart himself commonly uses a mobile phone in his shoe.

In the 1969 The Brady Bunch episode "Sorry, Right Number", Mike Brady installs a (boothless) payphone in his home, after his children run up a large phone bill. He gets the suggestion from his maid Alice, whose boyfriend Sam had a payphone installed in his butcher shop after losing profits to "dead-head" customers. He gives his children extra allowance for two calls per day – any further calls they would have to pay out of their own regular allowance. However, he is later forced to make a business deal over the same payphone, and almost sabotages it when his prepaid 10¢ runs out and makes the customer question his company's financial stability. However, he manages to clinch the deal, and also manages to give the phone away to the customer, who is having his own problems with phoneaholic teenagers.

The 1986 film Jumpin' Jack Flash features Whoopi Goldberg's character being abducted while in a phone booth by picking up the booth itself with a tow truck and dragging it through Manhattan streets.

In the Harry Potter books – and the films – there is a red telephone box outside the Ministry of Magic that wizards use to access the Ministry. From the phone box, one must dial "62442" and the phone booth acts as a lift, taking visitors down underneath the ground to the Ministry.

A payphone booth is used as a time machine in the Bill & Ted film franchise, starting with Bill & Ted's Excellent Adventure (1989).

The 2002 film Phone Booth takes place in a phone booth. The main character is held hostage in it for a whole day. He has been using the payphone to call his mistress so that his wife will not see the telephone number on their cellular telephone bill.

A Mojave phone booth in an isolated area of the Mojave National Preserve miles from the paved road was the subject of an Internet meme and a 2006 independent film, Mojave Phone Booth. The original Pacific Bell booth was removed in 2000; for nostalgia, Lucky225 assigned its number (1-760-733-9969) to an open conference bridge in 2013.

Popular pop song "Payphone" by the band Maroon 5, featuring Wiz Khalifa, was released on their fourth studio album Overexposed.

The small town of Beggs, Oklahoma attracted national attention in the late 1970s when public payphones offering calls for only five cents had been essentially phased out across the country, but Beggs still had one.  As of 2020, Beggs still has a nickel payphone, maintained in front of the Beggs Telephone Company office.

In The Dresden Files book series, the titular character relies on older technology, including payphones, due to his magical powers interfering with more modern electronics (such as cellular phones).

Gallery

See also
 Red telephone box
 Telephone booth
 Orelhão

References

External links

 Pay phones: Is That Still A Thing? in the San Diego Union-Tribune.
 PayPhoneBox Index of payphone numbers and photographs of payphones in unusual or famous places around the world.
 World Payphone Images
 2600: Payphones of the World
 Payphone tones including coin tones for the US and the UK
 For North America:
 McPayphone Directory: Project to collect America's 1.3 million payphone numbers and numbers abroad.
 Payphone Project
 Payphone Directory
 Movies and television (TV) shows that portray the use of a payphone

Public phones
American inventions
Vending
Street furniture
1889 introductions
19th-century inventions